Keone Kapisi (born 19 April 1994) is a Samoan footballer who has represented Samoa internationally.  He plays as a midfielder for BYU Cougars men's soccer.

Kapisi was born in Pukalani, Hawaii and educated at Maui High School in Hawaii and Brigham Young University in Provo, Utah. In 2017 he was selected for the BYU team to contest the World University Games in Taipei.

He was selected for the Samoa national football team for the 2016 OFC Nations Cup. In June 2019 he was named to the squad for the 2019 Pacific Games.

References

External links
 

1994 births
Living people
Samoan footballers
Association football midfielders
Samoa international footballers
BYU Cougars men's soccer players
2016 OFC Nations Cup players